Mária Mikolajová (born 13 June 1999) is a Slovak footballer who plays as a midfielder for St. Pölten and has appeared for the Slovakia women's national team.

Career
Mikolajová has been capped for the Slovakia national team, appearing for the team during the 2019 FIFA Women's World Cup qualifying cycle.

International goals
''Scores and results list Slovakia's goal tally first:

References

External links
 
 
 

1999 births
Living people
Slovak women's footballers
Slovakia women's international footballers
Women's association football midfielders
AC Sparta Praha (women) players
FSK St. Pölten-Spratzern players
Expatriate women's footballers in the Czech Republic
Slovak expatriate sportspeople in the Czech Republic
Expatriate women's footballers in Austria
Slovak expatriate sportspeople in Austria
Partizán Bardejov players
ÖFB-Frauenliga players
Czech Women's First League players